Dendrobatinae is the main subfamily of frogs in the family Dendrobatidae, the poison dart frogs of Central and South America, found from Nicaragua to the Amazon basin in Brazil.

Description
Many species are brightly colored and all are toxic. Alkaloids in Phyllobates are particularly potent.

All species are presumed to show parental care, often by the male. However, some species show biparental care (Ranitomeya), whereas in Oophaga only females care for the tadpoles, feeding them with eggs, their only source of nutrition. The males are responsible for protecting the eggs from predation and keeping the eggs from drying out by urinating on them.

General
There are eight or seven genera in this subfamily: 

The most specious genera are Ranitomeya (16 species) and Andinobates (13 species). Dendrobates used to be much larger but currently contains only five species, having had most of its species split off into genera erected later.

References

Poison dart frogs